Wulfson is a surname. Notable people with the surname include:

Harris Wulfson (1974–2008), American composer, instrumentalist, and software engineer
Jay Wulfson, American railroad owner

See also
Wolfson